A team representing Ireland has competed at every Summer Paralympic Games but the country has never taken part in the Winter Paralympics. Irish athletes have won 178 Summer Paralympic medals, 47 gold, 57 silver and 74 bronze. Paralympics Ireland (formerly the Paralympic Council of Ireland) is the National Paralympic Committee. Athletes from Northern Ireland may compete for either Great Britain or Ireland at the Paralympics, on the same basis as at the Olympics. 

At the first Paralympic Games in 1960 in Rome Ireland were one of 23 nations to enter athletes. The team finished 12th in the medals table with both of Ireland's gold medals being won by Joan Horan. Horan won her medals in two different sports, one in women's St. Nicholas Round open archery and one in the women's 25 m Crawl complete class 2 swimming event. At the next Games, hosted by Tokyo in 1964, no Irish athlete won a medal, this remains Ireland's only Summer Paralympics with no medal winners. The most medals won by Ireland at a Paralympic Games is 65, 20 of them gold, at the 1984 Games hosted in New York and Stoke Mandeville.

At the 2008 Summer Paralympics, held in Beijing, Ireland won five medals in total, three of them gold. There was controversy over the participation of Derek Malone in the 7-a-side cerebral palsy football tournament. Malone, who had competed in the 800 m event at the Athens Paralympics was ruled as ineligible to compete by Games classification authorities on the grounds that his disability was not severe enough.

Medal tables

Medals by Summer Games

Medals by summer sport
Updated to the 2016 Summer Paralympics.

See also
 Ireland at the Olympics

References